The 1911 North Carolina A&M Aggies football team represented the North Carolina A&M Aggies of North Carolina College of Agriculture and Mechanic Arts during the 1911 college football season. The team was led by head coach Edward L. Greene.

Schedule

References

North Carolina AandM
NC State Wolfpack football seasons
North Carolina AandM Aggies football